The 2021 Serbia Open was a tennis tournament played on outdoor clay courts. It was the 5th and 1st edition of the event for male and female professional tennis players, respectively. It was part of the 2021 ATP Tour and the 2021 WTA Tour and took place in Belgrade, Serbia; in mid-April for men and mid-May for women. A second ATP tournament, called the Belgrade Open, was played in men's singles the week before the French Open.

Champions

Men's singles

  Matteo Berrettini def.  Aslan Karatsev, 6–1, 3–6, 7–6(7–0)

Women's singles

  Paula Badosa def.  Ana Konjuh 6–2, 2–0, ret.

Men's doubles

  Ivan Sabanov /  Matej Sabanov def.  Ariel Behar /  Gonzalo Escobar, 6–3, 7–6(7–5)

Women's doubles

  Aleksandra Krunić /  Nina Stojanović def.  Greet Minnen /  Alison Van Uytvanck 6–0, 6–2

Points and prize money

Point distribution

Prize money 

*per team

ATP singles main draw entrants

Seeds

1 Rankings are as of 12 April 2021

Other entrants
The following players received wildcards into the main draw:
  Nikola Milojević
  Danilo Petrović
  Viktor Troicki

The following players received entry from the qualifying draw:
  Facundo Bagnis
  Francisco Cerúndolo
  Gianluca Mager
  Arthur Rinderknech

The following players received entry as lucky losers:
  Roberto Carballés Baena
  Taro Daniel
  João Sousa

Withdrawals 
Before the tournament
  Borna Ćorić → replaced by  Federico Delbonis
  Pablo Cuevas → replaced by  João Sousa
  Márton Fucsovics → replaced by  Roberto Carballés Baena
  Gaël Monfils → replaced by  Federico Coria
  Yoshihito Nishioka → replaced by  Kwon Soon-woo
  Emil Ruusuvuori → replaced by  Taro Daniel
  Dominic Thiem → replaced by  Juan Ignacio Londero
  Fernando Verdasco → replaced by  Alexei Popyrin
  Jiří Veselý → replaced by  Marco Cecchinato
  Stan Wawrinka → replaced by  Ričardas Berankis

ATP doubles main draw entrants

Seeds

 Rankings are as of 12 April 2021

Other entrants
The following pairs received wildcards into the doubles main draw:
  Miomir Kecmanović /  Dušan Lajović
  Ivan Sabanov /  Matej Sabanov

The following pair received entry as an alternate:
  Artem Sitak /  Stefano Travaglia

Withdrawals 
Before the tournament
  Nikola Mektić /  Mate Pavić →  Artem Sitak /  Stefano Travaglia
  Hugo Nys /  Tim Pütz →  Matteo Berrettini /  Andrea Vavassori

Retirements 
  Rohan Bopanna /  Pablo Cuevas

WTA singles main draw entrants

Seeds

1 Rankings are as of 10 May 2021

Other entrants
The following players received wildcards into the main draw:
  Olga Danilović
  Ivana Jorović
  Lola Radivojević 

The following players received entry using a protected ranking:
  Mihaela Buzărnescu
  Andrea Petkovic

The following players received entry from the qualifying draw:
  Cristina Bucșa
  Réka Luca Jani
  Ana Konjuh
  María Camila Osorio Serrano 
  Kamilla Rakhimova
  Wang Xiyu

The following player received entry as a lucky loser:
  Viktoriya Tomova

Withdrawals 
Before the tournament
  Kiki Bertens → replaced by  Aliaksandra Sasnovich
  Sorana Cîrstea → replaced by  Kaja Juvan
  Fiona Ferro → replaced by  Anna Kalinskaya
  Svetlana Kuznetsova → replaced by  Kristýna Plíšková
  Magda Linette → replaced by  Ajla Tomljanović
  Anastasia Pavlyuchenkova → replaced by  Viktoriya Tomova
  Elena Rybakina → replaced by  Polona Hercog
  Anastasija Sevastova → replaced by  Tereza Martincová
  Laura Siegemund → replaced by  Tímea Babos
  Donna Vekić → replaced by  Andrea Petkovic
  Zheng Saisai → replaced by  Nina Stojanović

Retirements 
  Ana Konjuh

WTA doubles main draw entrants

Seeds 

 1 Rankings as of May 10, 2021.

Other entrants 
The following pairs received wildcards into the doubles main draw:
  Ivana Jorović /  Lola Radivojević
   Elena Milovanović /  Dejana Radanović 

The following pair received entry into the doubles main draw using a protected ranking:
  Natela Dzalamidze /  Irina Khromacheva

The following pair received entry as alternates:
  María Camila Osorio Serrano /  Emily Webley-Smith

Withdrawals 
Before the tournament
  Aliona Bolsova /  Ankita Raina → replaced by  Mihaela Buzărnescu /  Ankita Raina
  Irina Khromacheva /  Danka Kovinić → replaced by  Natela Dzalamidze /  Irina Khromacheva
  Elena Milovanović /  Dejana Radanović → replaced by  María Camila Osorio Serrano /  Emily Webley-Smith
  Anastasia Potapova /  Vera Zvonareva → replaced by  Tímea Babos /  Vera Zvonareva

References

External links 
Tournament overview on ATP Tour website
Official website of the men's tournament
Official website of the women's tournament

Serbia Open
Serbia Open
Serbia Open
Serbia Open
Serbia Open
Serbia Open